Amandine Hesse and Harmony Tan were the defending champions but Tan chose not to participate. Hesse partnered alongside Jessika Ponchet, but lost in the first round to Flavie Brugnone and Lucie Wargnier.

Mariam Bolkvadze and Samantha Murray Sharan won the title, defeating Audrey Albié and Léolia Jeanjean in the final, 7–6(7–5), 6–0.

Seeds

Draw

Draw

References
Main Draw

Internationaux Féminins de la Vienne - Doubles